Disney Live Entertainment is the theatrical live entertainment production division of Walt Disney Imagineering, the design and development arm of Disney Parks, Experiences and Products, a segment and direct subsidiary of The Walt Disney Company.

History

Disney Entertainment
Formerly founded as Walt Disney Entertainment as a wing of the Walt Disney Company, it produced all shows and parades for Disney worldwide, including everything from the Disney-created Super Bowl Half-time shows to theme parks. The division was altered on January 31, 2001, at the retirement of Executive Vice President, Ron Logan, who was the head of the division.

Disney Creative Entertainment
Disney Creative Entertainment was founded in 2000 with the arrival of Executive Vice President Anne Hamburger.

Works
Some of the company's most notable works since being officially formed in 2000 include:

Disneyland Resort 
 Disneyland
Fantasmic!
The Lion King Parade
Light Magic
Believe... There's Magic in the Stars
Believe... In Holiday Magic
Snow White: An Enchanting Musical
Remember... Dreams Come True
Walt Disney's Parade of Dreams
Disney's Celebrate America
Mickey's Soundsational Parade
Magical
The Magic, the Memories, and You
Mickey and the Magical Map
Paint the Night Parade
Disneyland Forever
Together Forever
 Mickey’s Mix Magic
Magic Happens Parade
Wondrous Journeys
Disney California Adventure
Pixar's Block Party Bash 
Pixar Play Parade 
World of Color
Winter Dreams 
Celebrate 
Season of Light 
Villainous
One
 Aladdin: A Musical Spectacular
 Disney Junior – Live on Stage!
 Frozen – Live at the Hyperion
 The Golden Mickeys

Walt Disney World Resort 
 Magic Kingdom
 SpectroMagic
 The Legend of the Lion King
 Wishes: A Magical Gathering of Disney Dreams
 The Magic, the Memories, and You
 Celebrate the Magic
 Once Upon a Time
 Disney Festival of Fantasy Parade Happily Ever After
 Disney Enchantment Epcot
 A New World Fantasy Laserphonic Fantasy IllumiNations IllumiNations 25 Reflections of Earth
 Epcot Forever Harmonious

 Disney's Hollywood Studios
 Dick Tracy Fantasmic! Beauty and the Beast Live on Stage! The American Idol Experience Disney Junior – Live on Stage! Star Wars: A Galactic Spectacular The Golden Mickeys Disney's Animal Kingdom
 Festival of the Lion King Finding Nemo – The Musical The Jungle Book: Alive with Magic Rivers of Light Tokyo Disney Resort 
 Tokyo Disneyland
 Cinderellabration: Lights of Romance Mickey's Gift of Dreams Disney's Dreams on Parade Jubilation! Happiness is Here Parade Once Upon a Time Frozen Forever Disney Gifts of Christmas Dreaming Up Celebrate! Tokyo Disneyland Mickey's Musical Dream Tokyo DisneySea
 Legend of Mythica BraviSEAmo! Fantasmic! Believe! Sea of Dreams Disneyland Paris 
 Disneyland Park (Paris)
 Disney's Once Upon a Dream Parade Wishes: A Magical Gathering of Disney Dreams Disney Dreams! Disney IlluminationsDisney Stars on Parade The Enchanted Fireworks The Legend of the Lion King Winnie the Pooh and Friends, Too Animator's Musical Fireworks Walt Disney Studios Park
 Disney Junior: Live On Stage! Animagique Disney Village
 Buffalo Bill's Wild West Dinner Show Hong Kong Disneyland Resort 
 Hong Kong Disneyland
 Festival of the Lion King Mickey and the Wondrous Book Flights of Fantasy Parade Disney in the Stars Mickey's Rainy Day Express Paint the Night Follow Your Dreams Momentous Disney Cruise Line 
  Twice Charmed – Disney Magic
 Tangled The Musical  – Disney Magic
 Toy Story the Musical – Disney Wonder
 The Golden Mickeys – Disney Wonder and Disney Dream
 Disney's Believe – Disney Fantasy and Disney Dream
 Villains Tonight! – Disney Magic and Disney Dream

 Other venues 
 Main Street Electrical Parade — New York Route at New York, New York (As part of the opening of Hercules)
 2000 Super Bowl Half Time Show  2016 Honda Celebration of Light – Vancouver Fireworks  2022 Special Olympics USA Games – Opening Ceremony 2023 Honda Celebration of Light – Vancouver Fireworks Main Street Electrical Parade — Hollywood Boulevard'' at Hollywood, California (As part of the opening of Wish)

References

Walt Disney Parks and Resorts
Live
Companies based in Glendale, California
2000 establishments in California
American companies established in 2000